Neela Padmanabhan (born. 26 April 1938), is a Tamil writer from Nagercoil, India. He also writes in Malayalam.

Biography
Neela Padmanabhan was born in Kanyakumari District. He obtained a B. Sc in Physics and a degree in Electrical Engineering from Kerala University. He worked in the Kerala State Electricity Board till his retirement in 1993. His first noted work was the novel Thalaimuraigal (lit. Generations). He has written 20 novels, 10 short story collections, 4 volumes of poetry and 7 essay collections in Tamil. In Malayalam, he has published a novel, four short story collections and a single essay collection. Besides Tamil and Malayalam, he also has a few English works to his credit. During 1985-89 he was the Tamil editor at Sahitya Akademi and was the convener of the Akademi's Tamil advisory board during 1998-2002.  In 2007, he was awarded the Sahitya Akademi Award for Tamil for his novel Ilai uthir kaalam (lit. Autumn). He had earlier won the Sahitya Akademi Translation Prize in 2003 for his translation of Ayyappa Paniker's works into Tamil. In 2010, his novel Thalaimuraigal was made into a Tamil film titled Magizhchi (lit. Happiness). His most noted work is his novel Pallikondapuram.(lit. Where the Lord sleeps). He currently lives in Thiruvananthapuram.

Partial bibliography

Novels
Thalaimuraikal (1968)
Pallikondapuram (1970)
Filekal (1973)
Uravugal (1975)
Min ulagam (1976)
Yaathirai (1977)
Anubavangal (1977)
Samar (1977)
Nerru Vanthavan (1978)
Udaya Tharagai (1980)
Vattathin veliyae (1980)
Bhagavathi kovil theru (1981)
Bothayil karaithavaigal (1985)
Thee (1985)
Murivugal (1985)
Therodum veedhi (1987)
Thee Thee (1990) (Malayalam)
Dhavam seidhavargal (1991)
Vellam (1994)
Koondil pakshigal (1995)
Ilai uthir kaalam (2005)

Short story collections
Moham muppathaandu (1969)
Sandayum Sambandhamum (1972)
Moondravathu naal (1974)
Irandavathu mugam (1978)
Naagammava (1978)
Siragadikal (1978)
Kathakal irupathu (1980) (Malayalam)
Sathityanin sannithiyil (1985)
Erumbukal (1987) (Malayalam)
Vaana veethiyil (1988)
Arkande Koanil (1997) (Malayalam)
Avaravar antharangam (1998)
Verathavar(2003) (Malayalam)

References

External links
Official website

1938 births
Living people
20th-century Indian novelists
20th-century Indian translators
Malayalam-language writers
Recipients of the Sahitya Akademi Award in Tamil
Tamil writers
20th-century Indian short story writers
Novelists from Tamil Nadu
People from Kanyakumari district
People from Nagercoil
University of Kerala alumni
Recipients of the Sahitya Akademi Prize for Translation